Namialo is a small town in northeastern Mozambique.

Transport 

It lies on the northernmost railway system in Mozambique, leading to the port of Nacala. That railway line has a triangle and other sidings.  It is the site of a concrete sleeper plant built in 2013 by WEGH. The cement comes from Nacala.

See also 
 Railway stations in Mozambique

References

External links 

Wegh Group website

Populated places in Nampula Province